The Kernen Omloop Echt-Susteren was a one-day cycling race that was held annually in the Netherlands from 2008 to 2017. It was rated a category 1.2 event on the UCI Europe Tour.

Winners

References

Cycle races in the Netherlands
2008 establishments in the Netherlands
Recurring sporting events established in 2008
UCI Europe Tour races
Cycling in Limburg (Netherlands)
Sport in Echt-Susteren
Defunct cycling races in the Netherlands